Blues 'N' Jazz is the 29th album by B.B. King released in 1983. It was recorded on his 57th birthday, September 16, 1983.

Background
Writing in the album sleeve-notes, producer Sid Seidenberg says: "Recording his forty-first album on his birthday in New York was a highlight of B.B.'s career. Returning from one of his most successful tours, in Europe where he played at most of the continent's jazz festivals. B.B. King went into the studio with 'his friends' from Blues and Jazz and began to express himself."

Reception
Eugene Chadbourne reviewed the album for AllMusic.

The album won a Grammy Award for best blues album of 1983.

Track listing

Personnel

Musicians
B.B. King – vocals, guitar
Harold Austin, Donald A. Wilkerson – saxophone
William "Billy" Butler – guitar
Warren Chiasson – vibraphone
Arnett Cobb, Fred Ford – tenor saxophone
Lloyd Glenn – piano
Major Quincey Holley Jr. – bass guitar
Oliver Jackson – drums
John J. Longo Sr., James Bolden, Calvin Owens, Woody Shaw – trumpet
Edgar Synigal Jr. – baritone saxophone

Technical
Sidney A. Seidenberg – producer
Calvin Owens – arranger
Peter Darmi – engineer
Doug Grama – assistant engineer
Bill Kipper – mastering
Kathe Schreyer – art director and designer
Timothy Eames – birthday cake
Larry DuPont – photographer

References

External links
B.B. King – Blues 'N' Jazz at discogs.com

1983 albums
B.B. King albums
MCA Records albums